Pekka Juhani Kuusisto (born 17 January 1945) is a Finnish former ice hockey defenseman and Olympian.

Career 
Kuusisto played with Team Finland at the 1968 Winter Olympics held in Grenoble, France. He previously played for Rosenlewin Urheilijat-38 and Ilves in the Liiga league.

References

1945 births
Living people
Ice hockey people from Tampere
Finnish ice hockey defencemen
Ice hockey players at the 1968 Winter Olympics
Olympic ice hockey players of Finland
Ilves players